Bognor may refer to:

Places
 Bognor Regis, a town in Sussex, England simply called Bognor from 680 to 1930
 Bognor Regis Town F.C., its football club
 Bognor, Ontario, part of Meaford, Ontario, Canada

Other
 Bognor (carmaker), based in Uruguay
 Bognor (TV series), a British television series from 1981